Osman is a side-scrolling action platforming game produced by Mitchell Corp. that was released as a coin-operated arcade game in 1996. Many ex-Capcom staff including Kouichi Yotsui (credited as Isuke), worked on the original arcade version of Strider and designed Osman as an unofficial sequel to Strider. Yotsui directed both titles.

In contrast to Striders futuristic Kazakh-Soviet setting, Osman is set in a neon-lit cyberpunk Arabian setting, while Strider Hiryu is replaced by an Eastern protagonist named Kirin who fights without any weapons. 1UP.com included the game in its "Games to Play Before You Die" list. The game's bizarre plot supposedly mocks director Kouichi Yotsui's experience at Capcom after Strider.

Gameplay

The controls of Osman consists of an eight-way joystick for moving the character, and three action buttons for attacking, jumping, and activating a special attack which will destroy all on-screen enemies (which has only a limited number of uses and cannot be fully replenished until the player loses a life). The player can also climb walls and ceilings as well. The player character attacks primarily with his powerful kicks, which can fatally slice through most of the enemy soldiers in the face. Pressing down and jump will cause to slide. While sliding, the player character can do a slide kick with the attack button or grab certain enemies and flip them over with the jump button. The player can also dash by holding the joystick left or right after sliding.

There are four types of power-up capsules that the player can retrieve by destroying certain floating containers. The red capsules will increase the player character's attack power by allowing him to create body images of himself that will mimic his movement. The main character's attack power can be determined by the color of his pants. In his starting level, the character's pants will be blue, which changed to purple with the first power-up (allowing him to create one body image), followed by red (two body images) and white (four body images). The strongest attack level is black, which increases the player character's attack range. If the player takes damage from an enemy Osman's attack power will be reduced by one level. Other power-up items include a green power-up that restores one health point, a yellow power-up that increases the maximum health by one point, and a blue power-up that restores the player's complete health.

Story
Osman is set in a dystopian late 21st century in which Earth is under control of a single federal government. One day, a new threat known as “Abdullah the Slaver”—an evil sorceress who wants to take control of the world—appears, causing widespread terror and panic. This fear incites the abandonment of all economic activity and corruption in the government, which now undermines the foundations of society itself. Judicial Affairs Director, Jack Layzon, fears the worst and summons a lone assassin.

The player controls a Cannon Dancer called Kirin; a top-class agent in a mercenary unit known as “Teki,” and a highly skilled martial arts fighter. As he travels, he has to face not only Abdullah the Slaver and the government forces but also the other members of the Teki, who want him dead for personal reasons.

Ports
In a 2014 interview, Roy Ozaki said that he wants to bring Osman to the console by looking for video game publishers willing to assist in publishing the game. In August 2022, it was announced that the game would be released by ININ Games for Nintendo Switch, PlayStation 4, PlayStation 5, Xbox One and Xbox Series X and Series S in 2023. They had also confirmed involvement from original game's director Kouichi Yotsui and artist Takashi Kogure.

See also
 Run Saber
 Moon Diver

Notes

References

Bibliography

External links
 Cannon-Dancer at Mitchel Corp. 

1996 video games
Arcade video games
Arcade-only video games
Cyberpunk video games
Platform games
Video games developed in Japan
Single-player video games
Beat 'em ups
Mitchell Corporation games
Atlus games
Video games based on Arabian mythology